Guido De Felip (21 September 1904 – 21 September 1968) was an Italian rowing coxswain, born in Venice, who competed in the 1920 Summer Olympics.

In 1920 he coxed the Italian boat which won the gold medal in the coxed pair event.

References

External links
 Profile

1904 births
1968 deaths
Sportspeople from Venice
Coxswains (rowing)
Italian male rowers
Olympic gold medalists for Italy
Olympic rowers of Italy
Rowers at the 1920 Summer Olympics
Olympic medalists in rowing
Medalists at the 1920 Summer Olympics